is a Japanese professional baseball Infielder of Nippon Professional Baseball(NPB). He previously played in NPB for the Fukuoka SoftBank Hawks.

Professional career

Fukuoka SoftBank Hawks
On October 22, 2015, Kurose was drafted  by the Fukuoka Softbank Hawks in the 2015 Nippon Professional Baseball draft.

In 2016–2018 season, Kurose played in the Western League of NPB's second leagues, but did not get a chance to be promoted to the Pacific League, and signed a contract as a developmental player from the 2019 season.

In 2019–2021 season, he played in informal matches against the Shikoku Island League Plus's teams and amateur baseball teams, and played in the Western League of NPB's minor leagues.

On July 28, 2022, Kurose signed a 6.5 million yen contract as a registered player under control for the first time in four seasons.

On July 30, he debuted in the Pacific League against the Saitama Seibu Lions, and recorded his first RBI on July 31.

October 22, 2022, the Hawks announced he was a free agent.

References

External links

 Career statistics - NPB.jp
 12 Kenta Kurose PLAYERS2022 - Fukuoka SoftBank Hawks Official site

1997 births
Living people
Fukuoka SoftBank Hawks players
Japanese baseball players
Nippon Professional Baseball infielders
Baseball people from Osaka Prefecture